Xanəgah or Khanaga or Khanegya may refer to:
Xanəgah, Ismailli, Azerbaijan
Xanəgah, Jalilabad, Azerbaijan
Xanəgah, Khizi, Azerbaijan
Xanəgah, Lerik, Azerbaijan
Xanəgah, Nakhchivan (disambiguation)
Xanəgah, Julfa, Azerbaijan
Xanağa, Azerbaijan
Xanəgah, Quba, Azerbaijan
Khanaga, Iran, in Ardabil Province
Khanagya, Iran, in East Azerbaijan Province

See also
Khanqah (disambiguation), places in Iran and Afghanistan